The John Ashworth House a historic residence in Beaver, Utah, United States, that is listed on the National Register of Historic Places (NRHP).

Description
The house is located at 115 South 200 West and was built in 1875. The house was built by John Ashworth, then mayor of Beaver, probably for William Ashworth, one of his sons. It was deemed

John Ashworth lived in the large house to the east on the same block (the John Ashworth House, also NRHP-listed).

The structure was listed on the NRHP November, 29 1983. The listing include four contributing buildings.

See also

 National Register of Historic Places listings in Beaver County, Utah

Notes

References

External links

Houses on the National Register of Historic Places in Utah
National Register of Historic Places in Beaver County, Utah
Houses in Beaver County, Utah
Houses completed in 1875